Willy Achsel (1884–1955) was a German screenwriter and film director.

Selected filmography
 Your Valet (1922)
 Neptune Bewitched (1925)
 The Sandwich Girl (1933)

References

Bibliography

External links

1884 births
1955 deaths
Film people from Berlin